Marcus Silius Messala (born ca. AD 160, fl.193) was a Roman senator and suffect consul towards the end of the 2nd century. In 193, Messala was the suffect consul from May until June. He was in command of the location where the murder of Pertinax took place. Septimius Severus accused Messala of murdering Pertinax and using his influence to convene and order the Senate to install the Senator Didius Julianus as Emperor. Septimius Severus called the death of Didius Julianus divine providence and ordered the execution of Messala.

An inscription currently in the collection of the Pera Museum in Istanbul names Messala as consular legate of Bithynia et Pontus in the early years of the reign of Septimus Severus (c. 194–197).

It is possible that he may be the same Silius Messala condemned to death in the year AD 218 by Emperor Elagabalus. It is more likely, though, that the second Messala was a son of this senator.

Literature 
 PIR ² S 724, 725

References 

2nd-century births
3rd-century deaths
2nd-century Romans
3rd-century Romans
Suffect consuls of Imperial Rome
Roman governors of Bithynia and Pontus
Messala, Marcus Silius